Intra is a frazione of the municipality of Verbania, in Piedmont, northern Italy, located in a small alluvial plain. It is important for its port on Lake Maggiore and attendant tourism.
In Intra in 1905 was founded Zust, an Italian car manufacturing company, by engineer Roberto Züst, an Italian industrialist of Swiss origin, 
In 1909 was founded a rowing club, Canottieri Intra.
The main church is a basilica dedicate to San Vittore. The basilica di San Vittore was rebuilt during the first decade of XVIII century.

History 
Intra's area has been inhabited since prehistoric times. The oldest known population living in the area were the Lepontii., then it was added to the Roman Empire by Emperor Augustus in the first century AD.
During Middle Age was under the control of Conti di Biandrate, after the comune of Novara and then Duchy of Milan. Intra was an autonomous comune, in 1927 were merged to it Arizzano Inferiore, Trobaso and Zoverallo, in 1929 Unchio, then in 1939 Intra itself was merged with Pallanza to form Verbania under the royal decree n. 702 of 4 April 1939.

Notable people

 Giorgio Andreoli
 Sergio Bello
 Giambattista Bonis
 Luigi Capello
 Paolo Carraro
 Daniele Ranzoni
 Guido Sutermeister
 Paolo Troubetzkoy

Gallery

References

External links

 
Former municipalities of the Province of Verbano-Cusio-Ossola
Populated places on Lake Maggiore